Vuk Drašković (born 29 November 1946) is a Serbian writer and politician. He is the leader of the Serbian Renewal Movement, and served as the war-time Deputy Prime Minister of the Federal Republic of Yugoslavia in 1999 during the rule of Slobodan Milošević and the Minister of Foreign Affairs of both Serbia and Montenegro and Serbia from 2004 to 2007.

He graduated from the University of Belgrade Faculty of Law in 1968. From 1969-80, he worked as a journalist in the Yugoslav news agency Tanjug.

He was a member of the League of Communists of Yugoslavia and worked as the chief of staff of the Yugoslav President Mika Špiljak.

Early life and career
Drašković was born in the small village of Medja in the Banat region to a family of settlers from Herzegovina. He was three months old when his mother, Stoja Nikitović, died.

His father, Vidak, remarried and had two more sons - Rodoljub and Dragan; and three daughters - Radmila, Tanja and Ljiljana with Dara Drašković, meaning that young Vuk grew up with five half-siblings.

Shortly after Vuk's birth, the entire family went back to Herzegovina where he finished primary school in the village of Slivlje. He graduated high school in Gacko.

At his father's insistence, Drašković considered studying medicine in Sarajevo; however, the city was too "uptight and cramped" for his liking, so he went to study law in Belgrade instead.

In 1968, Drašković participated in anti-bureaucratic student revolts in Yugoslavia. After Josip Broz Tito promised reforms, Drašković initiated people to dance the Kozaračko kolo at the Faculty of Law. Drašković was a member of the Communist Youth Organization and later joined the League of Communists of Yugoslavia.

Between 1969-78, he was involved with journalism. He first worked for the state news agency Tanjug as its African correspondent stationed in Lusaka, Zambia. He was discharged from his post after publishing misleading information regarding the Rhodesian Bush War, creating a diplomatic incident.

He then took a job as press adviser to the Yugoslav Union of Trade Unions (Savez Sindikata Jugoslavije) and then became editor-in-chief of Rad, a trade union paper. During his time as press adviser, Drašković spent some time as the personal secretary to the organisation's president Mika Špiljak.

In 1981, Drašković published his first novel Sudije (Judges) which described a judge resisting political pressure.

In 1982, Drašković was expelled from the Communist party after he published his second novel Nož (Knife). The novel tells the story of a man who is raised as a Bosnian Muslim who comes to believe that Serbs killed his family, only to later learn that his ethnic heritage is Serbian and that his adoptive family was guilty of murdering his birth-family. The book caused controversy as it reignited divisive ethno-nationalist issues which Tito and the Communist Party tried to suppress. The party condemned and subsequently banned the book, which was also published in English. The book was made into a movie in 1999 entitled The Dagger or The Knife in English.

His novels Molitva 1–2 (Prayer 1–2, 1985) and Ruski konsul (Russian consul, 1988) also explored the suffering of Serbs during World War II, while Noć generala (The General's Nights) published in 1994 dealt with Draža Mihailović's last days.

Political career

In March 1989, Drašković along with Mirko Jović and Vojislav Šešelj founded the Sava Association. The group dedicated itself to the protection of the Serbian language and the defense of Kosovo and Metohija. In the late 1980s, Drašković was in agreement with Šešelj's sentiments about deporting Albanians from Kosovo and suggested that "a special fund" was needed "to finance the repopulation of Kosovo by Serbs". However, Jović, Šešelj and Drašković soon found themselves at political crossroads and their party disintegrated in three pieces. The Sava Association turned into the Serbian National Renewal Party under the leadership of Jović in January 1990. Meanwhile, Drašković founded the Serbian Renewal Movement (Srpski Pokret Obnove, SPO), a democratic nationalist party in March and Šešelj created his Serbian Radical Party in February 1991.

On 26 September 1990, Drašković declared that his armed "volunteers" would be willing to defend Krajina Serbs while three days later in an interview with Delo, Drašković stated: "Serbia must obtain all territories in what is today Herzegovina, Bosnia, Slavonia, Dalmatia, in these parts of Croatia where the Serbs made a majority of the population until 6 April 1941, when the Ustasha genocide against them began...Wherever the Serb blood was shed by the Ustashas knives, wherever there are our graves there are our borders". Also he claim that most of Muslims are "burdened with Serbian origin" and that "they run away from themselves because they know that they are Orthodox and Serbs". The Serbian Renewal Movement (SPO) participated in the first post-communist democratic elections, held on 9 December 1990, but finished a distant second amidst the total blackout from the pro-Milošević state media. Following that failure Drašković kept the pressure on Serbian President Slobodan Milošević via street protests, organizing mass demonstrations in Belgrade on 9 March 1991. The police intervened, and clashed with demonstrators with some damage to public buildings resulting in the Yugoslav People's Army having to be brought in. Clashes between police and protesters resulted in two deaths, one student and one officer and injuries to over 200 people. Demonstrations ended after the Milošević government agreed to concessions.

Drašković became a leading opponent of Milošević. His fiery oratory skills and emotional speeches earned him the monicker "Czar of the Streets".

While Drašković was a nationalist, he also held pro-Western and anti-war views. His plan was to rapidly transform the biggest and most populous part of Yugoslavia (Serbia) according to Western standards so that the eventual international involvement in solving Yugoslav crisis would turn in Serbian favour and produce a peaceful solution. His ideological opponents often cite his strong nationalist feelings (attempting rehabilitation of Serb-nationalist Chetniks) as contrarian to his insistence on peaceful solution to the Yugoslav crisis. Political opponents have claimed Drašković's political engagement at this early stage of his political career was full of inconsistencies and seemingly diametrically opposing views and actions. However, according to Draskovic, his (and that of his party) pro-Western peaceful stance, has never wavered since the start of the political crisis in Yugoslavia. He insisted that Serbian government should promote radical democratic shift, renew traditional alliances with Western nations (including entry into NATO) as a way to preserve some form of Yugoslav confederation rather than pursue direct confrontation with the Croats.

His party SPO organized a paramilitary unit called the Serbian Guard led by former criminals such as Đorđe "Giška" Božović and Branislav "Beli" Matić, with Božović dying in Croatia in October 1991. Matić was killed by the Milošević secret police in April 1991. And although Drašković initially claimed this militia was an incitement to Serbian authorities to form a non-ideological and a national armed force outside of Yugoslav People's Army, he eventually distanced himself from the paramilitary formation altogether.

According to historian Dubravka Stojanović, while Drašković's anti-war views were sincere, he also supported a nationalist program little different in its goals to that of Milošević, and he and his party was never able to reconcile these opposing currents.

His anti-war views came to the fore in mid to late 1991, particularly in November of that year when he wrote a passionate condemnation of the bloody siege of Vukovar in a Serbian daily Borba.

In early 1992, he called on all citizens of Bosnia to reject nationalism. In 1993, he and his wife Danica were arrested, beaten and sent to a high-security prison following street riots in Belgrade. Only his hunger strike, and international outrage pressured the Yugoslav government to release the couple.

In 1996, SPO formed the opposition alliance Zajedno ("Together") with the Democratic Party of Zoran Đinđić and the Civic Alliance of Serbia under Vesna Pešić, which achieved major successes in the local elections in November that same year before splitting.

Drašković's SPO participated on its own at the September 1997 election, boycotted by his former partners despite an array of local electronic media outlets being in opposition hands.

In January 1999, SPO, a parliamentary party, was asked to join a coalition with Milošević's Socialist Party of Serbia as tension with US and NATO increased in order to use his influence with Western politicians. In early 1999, Drašković became the deputy prime minister of the Federal Republic of Yugoslavia. He did so in response to Milošević's appeal for national unity in the face of Albanian uprising in Kosovo and a looming confrontation with NATO. He was sacked by the Prime Minister Momir Bulatović on 28 April 1999.

A failed attempt at assassinating Drašković took place on 3 October 1999 on the Ibar highway when four of his close associates were murdered, and on 15 June 2000 in Budva.

In 2005, Milorad Ulemek was sentenced to 40 years in prison for the murder of Đinđić and Ivan Stambolić and the assassination attempt on Drašković in 2000.

Post-Milošević

In what he himself later termed "a bad political move", Drašković kept his SPO out of the wide anti-Milošević Democratic Opposition of Serbia (DOS) coalition that formed in 2000, meaning that his candidate in the 24 September 2000 federal presidential elections, Vojislav Mihailović, achieved little success and that SPO also was not successful in the subsequent parliamentary election where the DOS won overwhelmingly. Because of this, Drašković and his party were marginalized over the next three years.

In the fall of 2002, he attempted a comeback as one of the eleven candidates in the Serbian presidential elections, which were subsequently unsuccessful due to low turnout. Despite a polished marketing campaign that saw Drašković change his personal appearance and tone down his fiery rhetoric, he ended up with only 4.5% of the total vote, well behind Vojislav Koštunica (31.2%) and Miroljub Labus (27.7%), both of whom moved on to the second-round runoff.

His next chance for political redemption came in late 2003. Fully aware of SPO's, as well as his own, weak political standing after more than 3 years in political oblivion, Drašković entered his party into a pre-election coalition with New Serbia (NS), thus reuniting with old party colleague Velimir Ilić. Joining forces for the 2003 parliamentary election, they achieved limited success, but more importantly managed to get into the coalition that formed the minority government (along with DSS, G17 Plus), providing it with critical parliamentary seats to keep the far-right radicals (SRS) at bay.

In the subsequent division of power, Drašković received the high-ranking position of Serbia and Montenegro's foreign minister, a position he held until May 2007. In response to Montenegro's vote for independence, Drašković called for a restoration of Serbia's monarchy: "This is an historic moment for Serbia itself, a beginning which would be based on the historically-proven and victorious pillars of the Serbian state and I am talking about the pillars of a kingdom."

In August 2010, Drašković argued in favour of changing the Serbian Constitution of 2006 to remove references to Kosovo as a part of Serbia because according to him "Serbia has no national sovereignty over Kosovo whatsoever. All of Serbia knows that Kosovo is not really a province within Serbia, that it is completely beyond the control of the government and the state of Serbia".

Personal life
Drašković is married to Danica (née Bošković). The two met in 1968 during student protests.

Literary works

 Me, a philistine (1981)
 Judge (1981)
 Knife (1982)
 Prayer (1985)
 Prayer 2 (1986)
 Answers (1986)
 Russian Consul (1988)
 Everywhere Serbia (1989)
 Night of general (1994)
 Reminders (2001)
 Target (2007)
 Dr Aron (2009)
 Via Romana (2012)
 Far away (2013)
 The memoirs of Jesus (2015)
 Stories about Kosovo (2016) 
 Slice of time (2016)
 Who killed Katarina? (2017)
 Aleksandar of Yugoslavia (2018)
 I grob i rob (2020)
 Ožiljci života (2022)

See also

March 9th Protest
Ibar Highway assassination attempt

Notes and references

Notes

References

External links
 Party biography
 Official biography as a Minister of Foreign Affairs

1946 births
Living people
People from Žitište
Eastern Orthodox Christians from Serbia
Candidates for President of Serbia
Serbian democracy activists
Serbian National Renewal politicians
Serbian Renewal Movement politicians
Serbian monarchists
Serbian novelists
Serbian writers
University of Belgrade Faculty of Law alumni
Foreign ministers of Serbia
Government ministers of Serbia
Serbian nationalists
Serbian anti-communists
Serbian people of Bosnia and Herzegovina descent